Mayra de la Rosa (born 8 March 1996) is a Panamanian footballer who plays as a defender. She has been a member of the Panama women's national team.

International career
De la Rosa capped for Panama at senior level during the 2014 CONCACAF Women's Championship qualification.

See also
 List of Panama women's international footballers

References

1996 births
Living people
Women's association football defenders
Panamanian women's footballers
Panama women's international footballers